Taffs Well Rugby Football Club are a rugby union club based in Taff's Well in south Wales. Taffs Well RFC were founded in 1887 and applied for and were successful in gaining membership to the Welsh Rugby Union in 1900. The club is a feeder club for the Cardiff Blues.

The first recorded game took place at Pentyrch RFC, which Taffs Well RFC duly won by two goals, four tries and seven minors to nil.

The club has produced three Welsh captains, six Welsh internationals and three British and Irish Lions.

Club honours
Glamorgan County Silver Ball Trophy 1974-75 - Winners

Notable former players
  Tom Lewis (3 caps)
  Bleddyn Williams (22 caps)

References 

Rugby clubs established in 1887
Welsh rugby union teams